Habeas Corpus is the second album from St. Louis rock band Living Things. The album was recorded over a period of nine months in Hansa Tonstudio in Berlin. Michael Ilbert produced Habeas Corpus, unlike the previous record, Ahead of the Lions, which was produced by Steve Albini.

Track listing

"Brass Knuckles" – 3:15
"Mercedes Marxist" – 3:58
"Let It Rain" – 3:52
"Oxygen" – 3:14
"Cost of Living" – 3:44
"Island In Your Heart" – 4:24
"Snake Oil Man" – 4:38
"Post Millennium Extinction Blues" – 3:39
"Dirty Bombs" – 3:07
"Shake Your Shimmy" – 3:17
"The Kingdom Will Fall" – 2:51

Personnel
Lillian Berlin - vocals, guitar
Eve Berlin - bass guitar
Bosh Berlin - drums
Cory Becker - guitar

References

2009 albums
Living Things (band) albums
Jive Records albums